Saarani bin Mohamad (born 13 March 1961) is a Malaysian politician and teacher who has served as 14th Menteri Besar of Perak since December 2020 and Member of the Perak State Legislative Assembly (MLA) for Kota Tampan since March 2004. He served as Member of the Perak State Executive Council (EXCO) in the Barisan Nasional (BN) state administrations under former Menteris Besar Tajol Rosli Mohd Ghazali and Zambry Abdul Kadir from March 2004 to the collapse of the BN state administration in March 2008 and from February 2009 to another collapse in May 2018 and again in the Perikatan Nasional (PN) state administration under former Menteri Besar Ahmad Faizal Azumu briefly from March 2020 to the collapse of the PN administration in December 2020, State Leader of the Opposition of Perak from August 2018 to March 2020 as well as the MLA for Lenggong from November 1999 to March 2004. He is a member of the Supreme Council of the United Malays National Organisation (UMNO), a component party of the state ruling BN coalition which is aligned with the Pakatan Harapan (PH) coalition at the state and federal levels as of the 2022 elections. In addition, he is also the State Chairman of BN Perak since the 2018 elections.

Election results

Honours

Honours of Malaysia 
  :
  Member of the Order of the Defender of the Realm (AMN) (2002)
  :
 Meritorious Service Medal (PJK)
  Member of the Order of the Perak State Crown (AMP) (2000)
  Knight of the Order of Cura Si Manja Kini (DPCM) – Dato' (2004)
  Knight Grand Commander of the Order of the Perak State Crown (SPMP) – Dato' Seri (2021)

References

1962 births
Living people
People from Perak
Malaysian people of Malay descent
Malaysian Muslims
United Malays National Organisation politicians
University of Technology Malaysia alumni
Members of the Perak State Legislative Assembly
Perak state executive councillors
Leaders of the Opposition in the Perak State Legislative Assembly
21st-century Malaysian politicians
Members of the Order of the Defender of the Realm